Sergei Mikhailovich Nakariakov (born May 10, 1977, in Gorky) is a Russian-Israeli virtuoso trumpeter residing in Paris, France, who came to prominence in the late 1990s. He released his first CD recording (including works by Ravel, Gershwin and Arban's The Carnival of Venice) in 1992 at the age of 15.

Recordings
Sergei Nakariakov has recorded works by composers such as Joseph Haydn, Johann Nepomuk Hummel, J. B. Neruda, Mozart, Telemann, Felix Mendelssohn, and Tchaikovsky. He has recorded with The Saint Paul Chamber Orchestra conducted by Hugh Wolff, and the Philharmonia conducted by Vladimir Ashkenazy among many others. In 2004 he was portrayed in Jan Schmidt-Garre's film No More Wunderkind.

Nakariakov's recordings include:
 A. Arutunian: Trumpet Concerto (15'52")
 G. Gershwin: Rhapsody in Blue (12'00")
 P. Tchaikovsky: Variations on a Rococo Theme (18'40")
 J. Haydn: Concerto in C major, Hob. Vllb-l, originally for cello (23'00")
 W. A. Mozart: Concerto in B flat major, KV 191, originally for bassoon (19'00")
 J. Haydn: Trumpet concerto in E flat major, H.Ville/1, (15'00")
 F. A. Hoffmeister: Concerto in D major, originally for viola (17'00")
 J. N. Hummel: Trumpet concerto in E flat major (17'00")
 J. B. Neruda: Concerto in E flat major (15'12")
 C. Saint-Saëns: Introduction and Rondo Capriccioso (9' 05")
 N. Paganini: Moto Perpetuo (4'29")

The Flugelhorn
Nakariakov also has made several recordings performing on the flugelhorn. In his album Concertos for Trumpet in 1999, Nakariakov plays music transcribed for the trumpet from violin, viola, and cello concertos. He plays the flugelhorn for the famous Cello Concerto No. 1 by Haydn. In his album No Limit in 2000, Nakariakov plays Tchaikovsky's Variations on a Rococo Theme, originally for cello and orchestra, in a transcription for the flugelhorn. Nakariakov plays on a specially customized flugelhorn made by Antoine Courtois that has 4 valves, allowing him to play lower than normal flugelhorns.

Musical equipment

 AR Resonance Nakariakov model B♭ trumpet
 Courtois 156R "Nakariakov" flugelhorn

See also
 Nizhny Novgorod

References

External links
 

1977 births
Living people
Russian classical trumpeters
21st-century trumpeters